Kristo Galeta (born 9 April 1983) is an Estonian shot putter.

References

External links
IAAF Athlete’s profile

Estonian male shot putters
1983 births
Living people
Sportspeople from Viljandi